Bogna Sobiech (née Dybul; born 25 March 1990) is a Polish female handball player for Borussia Dortmund and the Polish national team.

She participated at the 2018 European Women's Handball Championship.

Personal life
She married Polish football player Artur Sobiech in 2011.

References

1990 births
Living people
Sportspeople from Chorzów
Polish female handball players
Expatriate handball players
Polish expatriate sportspeople in Germany
21st-century Polish women